Montreal steak seasoning, also known as Montreal steak spice, Canadian steak seasoning, or Canadian steak spice, is a spice mix used to flavour steak and grilled meats. It is based on the dry-rub mix used in preparing Montreal smoked meat, which comes from the Romanian pastramă (the ancestor of pastrami), introduced to Montreal by Romanian Jewish immigrants.

The primary constituents of Montreal steak seasoning include garlic, coriander, black pepper, cayenne pepper flakes, dill seed, and salt. The spice mix recipe varies slightly among restaurants and manufacturers.

History
The Montreal deli Schwartz's is credited with the creation of Montreal steak seasoning. It is rumoured that during the 1940s and 1950s, a Schwartz's broilerman by the name of Morris "The Shadow" Sherman began adding the deli's smoked meat pickling spices to his own rib and liver steaks. Soon the customers began asking for the same. Due to its popularity, it eventually became a norm in Montreal delis and steakhouses, such as the nearby Moishes Steakhouse and the Main Deli Steak House, to season their steaks similarly.

See also

 Steak sauce

References

Ashkenazi Jewish culture in Montreal
Cuisine of Quebec
Culture of Quebec
Jewish Canadian cuisine
Herb and spice mixtures
Montreal cuisine
Smoked meat
Steak
Romanian-Canadian history
Romanian-Jewish culture in Canada